John Albert Edward Woodman (9 July 1914 – 16 January 1984) was a professional association footballer who played in England during the 1930s.

Prior to turning professional, Woodman played for Windmill Hill School in Bristol and Melrose in the Bristol Suburban League. He signed with Bristol Rovers on 23 May 1935 and spent two years playing for them, ending the 1935–36 season as the club's top scorer with fifteen goals.

He commanded a transfer fee of £500 pounds, at the time a large sum, when he was signed by Preston North End in 1937. He failed to make a single first team appearance for Preston however, and the following season he was sold to Swindon Town for £350. During his spell in Swindon he again made no appearances for the first team. He signed for Wrexham in 1939, and played in all three of their matches before the 1939–40 Football League season was abandoned due to the outbreak of World War II.

References

1914 births
1984 deaths
Footballers from Bristol
Association football forwards
Bristol Rovers F.C. players
Preston North End F.C. players
Swindon Town F.C. players
Wrexham A.F.C. players
English Football League players
English footballers